This is a list of the coats of arms that are currently used in Singapore, or have been used during its history.

Official coat of arms

Government

Military

Historical arms

See also

Coat of arms of Singapore
List of Singaporean flags

 

Singapore